Woodside Township is located in Sangamon County, Illinois. As of the 2010 census, its population was 11,447 and it contained 5,668 housing units.

Geography

Cities, Towns, Villages
Jerome
Leland Grove
Southern View
Springfield (small portion)

Unincorporated Communities
Toronto

Demographics

References

External links
City-data.com
Illinois State Archives

Townships in Sangamon County, Illinois
Springfield metropolitan area, Illinois
Townships in Illinois